The Wenatchee Valley Museum & Cultural Center (WVMCC) is a museum in Wenatchee, Washington, that houses local and regional history, Native American heritage, and the propeller used in the first trans-Pacific flight.

Founded in 1939 by the Columbia River Archaeological Society, the museum, housed in two historic buildings, contains three floors of displays interpreting life along the Columbia River in Eastern Washington. WVMCC hosts a variety of special events and family programs throughout the year.

Exhibits

Propeller from the first trans-Pacific flight
The museum exhibits the propeller from Miss Veedol, the airplane that made the first nonstop trans-Pacific flight. Pilot Clyde Pangborn and co-pilot Hugh Herndon had dropped the planes wheels and landing gear early in the 1931 flight to maintain flying weight, so Pangborn had to skid-land Miss Veedols American touch-down in the hills of East Wenatchee, and the propeller was damaged during the landing.

Clovis points and other exhibits
Other exhibits include 11,000-year-old Clovis points which were discovered in 1987 in East Wenatchee; petroglyphs recovered prior to the construction of the Rock Island Dam; Native American trade history; a tree fruit exhibit featuring a 1920s-era apple packing line with its unique catapult sizing machine, a model H0 scale train layout portraying three Great Northern Railway routes across the Cascade Mountains from 1892 to the present; Main Street 1910 with a general store, farm shop, house interior, and vintage autos; and a working 1919 Wurlitzer pipe organ.

Programs
Some of the special programs WVMCC presents for children and adults are Super Summer Adventures, geology bus tours, silent movies accompanied by the pipe organ, regional art shows, railroad history field trips, and an annual Environmental Film Festival.

External links 
 Museum website

Museums established in 1939
Museums in Chelan County, Washington
History museums in Washington (state)
Art museums and galleries in Washington (state)
Buildings and structures in Wenatchee, Washington
Natural history museums in Washington (state)
Transportation museums in Washington (state)
Archaeological museums in Washington (state)
1939 establishments in Washington (state)
Aerospace museums in Washington (state)